Kovačevac is a village in the municipality of Prijepolje, Serbia. According to the 2002 census, the village has a population of 1,613 people.

Since 1979, includes part of the abolished settlement Velika Župa.

See also
Populated places of Serbia

References

Populated places in Zlatibor District